Mia Kirshner (born January 25, 1975) is a Canadian actress, writer and social activist. She is known for television roles as Mandy in 24 (2001–2005), as Jenny Schecter in The L Word (2004–2009), as Amanda Grayson in Star Trek: Discovery (2017–2019), and as Isobel Flemming in The Vampire Diaries (2010-2011). Her film credits include Love and Human Remains (1993), Exotica (1994), The Crow: City of Angels (1996), Mad City (1997), Not Another Teen Movie (2001) and The Black Dahlia (2006).

Early life 
Kirshner was born in Toronto, Ontario, the daughter of Etti (Henrietta), a teacher, and Sheldon Kirshner, a journalist who wrote for The Canadian Jewish News. Kirshner is a granddaughter of Holocaust  survivors; her father was born in the displaced persons camp at Bad Reichenhall in Germany in 1946, and met Kirshner's mother, a Bulgarian Jewish refugee, after they escaped to Israel. Kirshner's paternal grandparents were Polish Jews. Kirshner had a middle class upbringing and attended Forest Hill Collegiate Institute but later graduated from Jarvis Collegiate Institute. Kirshner studied Russian literature and the 20th-century movie industry at McGill University in Montreal. Her younger sister, Lauren Kirshner, a writer, was involved in the I Live Here project.

Career 

Kirshner started her career in 1989 in "Loving the Alien", a second-season episode of War of the Worlds, as both Jo, a young resistance fighter who is captured and  duplicated by the enemy aliens, and her doppelgänger. Kirshner made her film debut in 1993 at the age of 18 in Denys Arcand's Love and Human Remains. She convinced her father to sign a "nudity waiver" to play a dominatrix. The following year, she starred in Atom Egoyan's Exotica. In 1996, she appeared in The Crow: City of Angels. She also played Kitty Scherbatsky in the 1997 version of Anna Karenina.

Kirshner also appeared in the first three episodes of 24 as the assassin Mandy in 2001. She would later reprise the role for the second season's finale and in the latter half of the show's fourth season. Also in 2001, Kirshner played Catherine Wyler, The Cruelest Girl in School, in Not Another Teen Movie. The character is primarily a spoof of Kathryn Merteuil (played by Sarah Michelle Gellar) in Cruel Intentions, and was partially based on Mackenzie Siler (played by Anna Paquin) from She's All That. In Marilyn Manson's music video for "Tainted Love", which was featured on the movie's soundtrack, she made a cameo appearance as her character Catherine Wyler.

In 2004, Kirshner was cast as writer Jenny Schecter, a main character in the drama series The L Word. She remained with the show through 2009, for all six seasons.

In 2006, she starred in Brian De Palma's The Black Dahlia in which she plays the young aspiring actress Elizabeth Short, whose mutilation and murder in 1947 remains unsolved. While the film itself was critically panned, many reviews singled out her performance for acclaim.  Stephanie Zacharek of Salon.com, in a largely negative review, notes that the eponymous character was "played wonderfully by Mia Kirshner..."  Mick LaSalle wrote that Kirshner "makes a real impression of the Dahlia as a sad, lonely dreamer, a pathetic figure." J. R. Jones described her performance as "haunting" and that the film's fictional screen tests "deliver the emotional darkness so lacking in the rest of the movie." In 2010, Kirshner co-starred in the film 30 Days of Night: Dark Days which began filming in the fall of 2009. In 2010, she was cast as Isobel Flemming, a guest role on The Vampire Diaries.

In 2011, she voiced the title character in Bear 71, a National Film Board of Canada web documentary that premiered at the Sundance Film Festival.

On April 20, 2012, it was announced that Kirshner would join the new Syfy series Defiance.

On October 9, 2013, it was mentioned on the Showcase blog that Kirshner would be one of several guest stars in season four of the television series Lost Girl.

In 2018, she began a recurring role on Star Trek: Discovery playing Amanda Grayson, foster mother of series protagonist Michael Burnham and mother of Spock, a role originated by Jane Wyatt on the original Star Trek.

On September 5, 2019, Entertainment Tonight's news outlet ET Online reported that Kirshner would play a character in Lifetime Television's movie, The College Admissions Scandal, with co-star Penelope Ann Miller in roles inspired by real life Hollywood stars Lori Loughlin's and Felicity Huffman's involvement in a massive college admissions bribery scam. Describing her role, Kirshner was quoted saying "This story is about privilege and corruption and it's about people who don't follow the rules because they think they're above rules... My character (based on Lori Loughlin but named "Bethany" in the film) is so corrupt, greedy, narcissistic, self-centered, and the dialogue is hilarious, so I'm glad that they're able to capture humor about this as well."

In September of 2020, it was announced that Kirshner would co-star with Ben Savage in a Hallmark Channel holiday film entitled Love, Lights, Hanukkah!, which premiered on December 12th, 2020. Kirshner plays a restaurant owner named Christina, who learns of her Jewish ancestry through a DNA test.

Philanthropy 

In October 2008, after seven years in production, Kirshner published the book I Live Here, which she co-produced with ex-Adbusters staffers Paul Shoebridge and Michael Simons, as well as writer James MacKinnon. In the book, four different groups of women and children refugees from places such as Chechnya, Juárez, Burma and Malawi tell their life stories. The book features original material from well-known comic and graphic artists including Joe Sacco and Phoebe Gloeckner. It was published in the U.S. by Random House/Pantheon. It was supported logistically by Amnesty International, which will receive proceeds from the book. After the release of the book, the Center for International Studies at MIT invited Kirshner to run a 4-week course on I Live Here in January 2009.

In popular culture 
Kirshner was ranked #43 on the Maxim Hot 100 Women of 2002. She and Beverly Polcyn were nominated for Best Kiss at the 2002 MTV Movie Awards for Not Another Teen Movie. In 2011 it was announced that Kirshner would be the face of Monica Rich Kosann's jewelry collection.

Personal life 
Between 2014 and 2015, Kirshner was in a relationship with actor and playwright Sam Shepard.

In September 2022, Kirshner penned an Instagram post reading, "La Mer. Cancer free," suggesting that she had recovered from the disease.

Filmography

Film

Television

Video games
 24: The Game (2006), as Mandy

References

External links 

 

1975 births
20th-century Canadian actresses
21st-century Canadian actresses
21st-century Canadian women writers
Activists from Toronto
Actresses from Toronto
Canadian child actresses
Canadian film actresses
Canadian people of Bulgarian-Jewish descent
Canadian people of Polish-Jewish descent
Canadian people of Israeli descent
Canadian Ashkenazi Jews
Canadian Sephardi Jews
Canadian television actresses
Canadian voice actresses
Jewish Canadian activists
Jewish Canadian actresses
Jewish Canadian writers
Jewish women writers
Living people
McGill University alumni
Writers from Toronto